This is an incomplete list of Hungarian painters. For sculptors see List of Hungarian sculptors

Gyémánt László

A
Béla Apáti Abkarovics - Hungarian painter and graphic artist (1888–1957)
Béla Nagy Abodi - Hungarian painter and graphic artist (1918–2012)
Mór Adler - Hungarian painter (1826–1902)
Gyula Aggházy - Hungarian painter and teacher (1850–1919)
Tivadar Alconiere - Austro-Hungarian painter (1797–1865)
Friedrich von Amerling - Austro-Hungarian portrait painter (1803–1887)
Margit Anna - Hungarian painter (1913–1991)
István Árkossy - Hungarian painter and graphic artist (1943–)

B
Ottó Baditz - Hungarian painter. He painted mostly genre pictures in an academic style (1849–1936)
Endre Bálint - Hungarian painter and graphic artist (1914–1986)
Rezső Bálint - Hungarian landscape painter (1885–1945)
Pál Balkay - Hungarian painter and teacher (1785–1846)
László Balogh - Hungarian painter
Ernő Bánk - Hungarian teacher painter noted for his miniature portraits (1883–1962)
Miklós Barabás - Hungarian painter noted for his portraits (1810–1898)
Jenő Barcsay - Hungarian painter (1900–1988)
Andor Basch - Hungarian painter (1885–1944)
Gyula Basch - Hungarian painter (1859–1928)
Gyula Batthyány
Gyula Benczúr - Hungarian painter and pedagogue (1844–1920)
Lajos Berán - Hungarian sculptor and artist noted for his medal work (1882–1943)
Róbert Berény - Hungarian painter (1887–1953)
Aurél Bernáth - Hungarian expressionist painter (1895–1982)
László Beszédes - Hungarian sculptor, noted for his small bronze and terracotta statuettes (1874–1922)
Sándor Bihari (1855–1906)
Tamás Bimbó - Hungarian landscape painter (1968-)
Zsolt Bodoni
Pál Böhm (1839–1905)
József Borsos - Hungarian portrait painter and photographer (1821–1883)
Miklós Borsos - Hungarian sculptor (1906–1990)
Sándor Bortnyik - Hungarian painter and graphic designer (1893–1976)
Samu Börtsök (1881–1931)
Gabor Breznay
József Breznay
Károly Brocky
Sándor Brodszky
Lajos Bruck

C
István Csók - Hungarian Impressionist painter (1865–1961)
Lajos Csontó - Hungarian painter
Béla Czóbel - Hungarian painter (1883–1976)
Tibor Czorba - painter (1906–1985)

D
Adrienn Henczné Deák (1890–956)
Valéria Dénes (1877–1915)
Gyula Derkovits
Balázs Diószegi - Hungarian painter primarily using the colour black (1914–1999)
László Dombrovszky - Hungarian painter (1894–1982)
János Donát - Hungarian painter (1744–1830)
Géza Dósa - Hungarian painter (1846–1871)
Orshi Drozdik - Hungarian feminist artist (1946–)

E
József Egry - Hungarian modernist painter (1883–1951)

F
Bogi Fabian - Hungarian painter who uses glow-in-the-dark techniques
Adolf Fényes
Árpád Feszty - Hungarian historical painter (1856–1914)
Béni Ferenczy - Hungarian sculptor and graphic artist (1890–1967)
Károly Ferenczy - Hungarian painter (1862–1917)
Noémi Ferenczy - Hungarian tapestry designer and weaver (1890–1957)

G
Tamas Galambos
Ilka Gedő - Jewish Hungarian artist (1921–1985)
Ernő Grünbaum - Jewish Hungarian painter (1908–1944/45)
Lajos Gulácsy
Jenő Gyárfás (1857–1925)
Líviusz Gyulai - Hungarian graphic artist, printmaker, illustrator (1937–2021)

H
Sam Havadtoy - neo-pop painter and interior designer (1952–)
Simon Hantaï - influential painter using folding method (1922–2008)
Adolf Hirémy-Hirschl - historical and mythological painting (1860–1933)
Simon Hollósy - Hungarian painter of Armenian ancestry (1857-1918)
Elmyr de Hory - Hungarian-born painter and Famous art forger (1906–1976)
Istvan Horkay - Hungarian painter (1945–)

I
Béla Iványi-Grünwald

J
Gyula Jakoby (1903–1985)
Viktor de Jeney
Ferenc Joachim - Hungarian (Magyar) painter of portraits and landscapes (1882–1964)
Zoltán Joó - Hungarian painter (1956–)

K
Bertalan Karlovszky
Lajos Kassák - Hungarian poet, novelist, painter, essayist, editor, and father of many modernisms (1887–1967)
Nándor Katona - painter (1864–1932)
Isidor Kaufman - Hungarian painter of Jewish themes (1853–1921)
Gusztáv Kelety - painter (1834–1902) 
Dóra Keresztes - Hungarian painter, printmaker, illustrator, graphic designer and animated film director (1953–)
Károly Kernstok
Károly Kisfaludy - Hungarian dramatist (1788–1830)
Bálint Kiss
Zoltán Klie
Béla Kondor - Hungarian painter, prose writer, poet, photographer, and avant-garde graphic artist (1931–1972)
Aladár Körösfői-Kriesch
József Koszta
Tivadar Csontváry Kosztka - Hungarian painter (1853–1919)

L
Márta Lacza - Hungarian graphic artist and portrait painter (born 1946)
Émile Lahner - Hungarian painter (1893–1980)
Philip Alexius de Laszlo - Hungarian painter of portraits of royal and aristocratic personages (1869–1937)
Sándor Liezen-Mayer
Emil Lindenfeld - Hungarian-American oil-painter (1905–1986)
Károly Lotz - German-Hungarian painter (1833–1904)

M
Viktor Madarász - Hungarian romantic painter (1840–1917)
Americo Makk - Hungarian ecclesiastical, historical portrait painter (1927–2015)
Jack C. Mancino - Hungarian Abstract expressionist (1968–)
Ádám Mányoki - Hungarian Baroque painter (1673–1757)
Ödön Márffy - Hungarian painter (1878–1959)
Károly Markó the Elder
Zsuzsa Máthé - Hungarian painter, founder of Transrealism  (1964–)
Eszter Mattioni (1902–1993) - Hungarian painter
László Mednyánszky - Hungarian painter in the Impressionist tradition (1852–1919)
Attila Meszlenyi
Géza Mészöly - Hungarian Romantic painter (1844–1887)
László Moholy-Nagy - Hungarian painter, professor, and photographer (1895–1946)
C. Pál Molnár (1894–1981)
Master M. S. - painter who specialized in late Gothic art and in early Renaissance art
Mihály Munkácsy - Hungarian painter of genre pictures and large scale biblical paintings (1844–1900)

N
István Nagy - Hungarian painter (1873–1937)
János Nagy Balogh - Hungarian painter (1874–1919)
Vilmos Aba Novák - Hungarian painter and graphic artist (1894–1941)

O
István Orosz - Hungarian painter, printmaker, graphic designer and animated film director (1951–)

P
László Paál - Hungarian Realist landscape painter (1846–1879)
Béla Pállik - painter and opera singer (1845-1908)
Arthur Pan - portraitist noted for paintings of Sir Winston Churchill and Jan Smuts
Károly Patkó - Hungarian painter and copper engraver, noted for his nude paintings in a plastic presentation (1895–1941)
Vilma Parlaghy Lwoff - Hungarian painter of portraits of royal and aristocratic personages (1863-1923)
Soma Orlai Petrich - Hungarian painter (1822–1880)
Bertalan Pór - Hungarian painter (1880–1964)

R
István Regős - Hungarian painter and designer (1954–)
István Réti - Hungarian painter, professor, art historian and leading member, as well as a founder and theoretician, of the Nagybánya artists' colony (1872–1945)
József Rippl-Rónai - Hungarian painter (1861–1927)
Charles Roka - Hungarian painter of artistic kitsch (1912–1999)
Tibor Rényi - contemporary Hungarian painter (1973–)
György Rózsahegyi - contemporary Hungarian painter (1940–2010)

S
István Sándorfi - Hungarian/French painter (1948–2007)
Michael Aloysius Sarisky - figure, genre, and landscape Hungarian painter, who lived in Ohio, USA (1906–1974)
János Saxon-Szász
Hugo Scheiber
Mihály Schéner - mid-20th century modernist artist (1923–2009)
Schilling Oszkar Von Tordai
Henriett Seth F. - Hungarian autistic savant poet, writer and artist (1980–)
Oliver Sin - contemporary Hungarian painter, science art, math art (1985–)
Bertalan Székely - Hungarian Romantic painter of historical themes (1835–1910)
Adam Szentpétery - Hungarian Abstract painter (1956-)
Pál von Szinyei-Merse - Hungarian painter and politician (1845–1920)
István Szőnyi
Lili Árkayné Sztehló - Hungarian painter and stained-glass decorator (1897–1959)

T
Judy Takács - Hungarian-American figurative realist painter (1962–)
Mór Than - Hungarian realistic, pre-impressionist style painter (1828–1899)
Ernő Tibor - Jewish Hungarian painter (1885–1945)
Lajos Tihanyi
János Tornyai - Hungarian painter (1869–1936)
Paul Takacs

U
Géza Udvary - Hungarian Romantic and Symbolist painter (1872–1932)

V
János Valentiny (1842–1902)
György Vastagh (1834–1922)
János Vaszary - Hungarian painter (1867–1938)
Lajos Vajda - Hungarian avant-garde painter (1908–1941)
Emil Vén

W
Henrik Weber - Hungarian portrait and history painter (1818–1866)
Félix Bódog Widder - Hungarian painter and graphic designer (1874–1939)

Z
Mihály Zichy - Hungarian painter and graphic artist (1827–1906)

Notes
Amerlich was Austro-Hungarian born in Vienna. Most of his artwork remains in Vienna but historically he is classified as of a dual nationality in the period he lived.

See also
List of Hungarians
List of painters

References

External links

Fine Arts in Hungary from the beginning to the mid-20th century with pictures

 
Painters
Hungary
Hungarian painters